François Lalande (29 November 1930 – 1 September 2020) was an Algerian-born French actor. He had performed in the theatre, on television, and films.

Filmography

Cinema
Un jour à Paris (1962)
Yo Yo (1965)
Le Gang (1977)
La Question (1977)
Herbie Goes to Monte Carlo (1977)
On peut le dire sans se fâcher (1978)
Rape of Love (1978)
Le beaujolais nouveau est arrivé (1978)
French Postcards (1979)
La Gueule de l'autre (1979)
Rien ne va plus (1979)
Que les gros salaires lèvent le doigt ! (1982)
Bras de fer (1985)
La Galette du roi (1986)
Dangerous Liaisons (1988)
La Révolution française (1989)
Milena (1991)
Aux yeux du monde (1991)
Impromptu (1991)
The Hour of the Pig (1993)
Les Visiteurs (1993)
La Vengeance d'une blonde (1994)
The Libertine (2000)

Television
Sarcelles-sur-Mer (1974)
Les Rebelles (1977)
Mamma Rosa ou la Farce du destin (1978)
Les Procès témoins de leur temps (1978)
Les Héritiers : Photos de famille (1978)
Les Cinq Dernières Minutes (1979)
L'Hôtel du libre échange (1979)
L'Étouffe grand-mère (1981)
Arcole ou la Terre promise (1981)
Julien Fontanes, magistrat (1982)
La Nuit du général Boulanger (1982)
Péchés originaux : On ne se quittera jamais (1984)
L'Appartement (1984)
L'Ami Maupassant (1986)
Samedi, dimanche, lundi (1986)
Les Aventuriers du Nouveau-Monde (1986)
Hallmark Hall of Fame : The Tenth Man (1988)
Douce France (1989)
Un conte des deux villes (1989)
Coma dépassé (1990)
Ferbac : Mariage mortel (1991)
Riviera (1991)
Tattle Tale (1992)
Fortitude (1994)
La Poursuite du vent (1998)
Maigret : Mon ami Maigret (2001)
Ainsi soient-ils (2012)

Awards
Nomination for the Molière Award for Best Supporting Actor in Home (1989)
Nomination for the Molière Award for Best Supporting Actor in Raisons de famille (2000)
Nomination for the Molière Award for Best Supporting Actor in Staline Mélodie (2001)

References

1930 births
2020 deaths
20th-century French actors
21st-century French actors
Pieds-Noirs
People from Mostaganem